Dustin Woodard (born March 8, 1998) is an American football center who is a free agent. He was drafted by the New England Patriots in the seventh round of the 2020 NFL Draft after playing college football at Memphis.

High school career
Woodard played at Chandler High School in Chandler, Arizona. He was named the best offensive lineman in the state of Arizona after his senior season, and committed to Memphis in January 2016. Woodard chose the Tigers over six other schools, including Stanford, Navy, and Army.

College career
Playing at Memphis, Woodard started 52 games to close out his career, playing his freshman and sophomore seasons at left guard, his junior year at right guard and his senior year at center. He tied the school record with 54 total games played in. Woodard garnered first-team all-American Athletic Conference honors following his junior season and was a second-team selection to that same list after his senior season. He was also on the Outland Trophy and Rimington Trophy watchlists his senior year, and earned praise for his run blocking ability.

Professional career
The New England Patriots selected Woodard in the seventh round with the 230th overall pick in the 2020 NFL Draft. On August 13, during his rookie training camp, he decided to retire from the NFL. Woodard unretired on April 7, 2021, and the Patriots reinstated him to their active roster. He was waived on April 16.

References

External links
 New England Patriots bio
 Memphis Tigers bio

1998 births
Living people
Players of American football from Arizona
Sportspeople from Chandler, Arizona
American football centers
Memphis Tigers football players
New England Patriots players